The women's singles badminton event at the 2014 Commonwealth Games took place between July 29 and August 3 at the Emirates Arena in Glasgow. The defending Commonwealth Games Games champion was Saina Nehwal of India, but did not compete in this year's games, after withdrawing due to injury.

Seeds
The seeds for the tournament were:

Results

Finals

Top Half

Section 1

Section 2

Bottom Half

Section 3

Section 4

References

Women's singles
2014 in women's badminton